PhpGedView is a free PHP-based web application for working with genealogy data on the Internet. The project was founded and is headed by John Finlay.  It is licensed under the GPL-2.0-or-later license.

PhpGedView is hosted on SourceForge, where it was Project of the Month in December 2003. It is a widely used interactive online genealogy application, with over 1600 registered sites as of November, 2008. On June 26, 2006, the PhpGedView site announced that PhpGedView was the most active project at Sourceforge. It was also second most active in July, 2006.

In early 2010, a majority of active PhpGedView developers stopped development on PhpGedView and created a fork.  The new, forked program is called webtrees.

Features
PhpGedView is a multi-user, platform-independent system, allowing for distributed work on a family tree. Users can view, contribute and approve others' contributions, depending on their status. PhpGedView has several modes for protecting the privacy of data, such as protecting all data from unregistered users, or protecting data on living people from unregistered users.

Several types of reports and diagrams can be produced, which can be exported as PDF files for viewing, storing, and printing. Maps can be generated that show all the locations mentioned for a person.

PhpGedView is installed on a web server. The user can either import a GEDCOM file to populate it or build a GEDCOM in place. An external genealogy program can be used to create, edit and upload the GEDCOM. GEDCOMs can also be edited directly in PhpGedView by multiple users registered via the web interface. For each individual in the GEDCOM, a range of data can be recorded, from standard genealogical information, such as dates and places, to employment, education, religion, photos, videos, sources of data, and more. Through version 3 it worked in both MySQL and a non-database index mode. From version 4 on, it works only with a database.

PhpGedView (version 4.1 and up) supports output to GRAMPS XML file format.

PhpGedView can be extended using modules. Several modules are available: interfaces to Gallery 2, phpBB, Lightbox (JavaScript), and Google Maps. PhpGedView previously had an integration module for Joomla which has since been discontinued.

See also

 webtrees, a fork of PhpGedView

References

External links
 
 Community Wiki
 

Free genealogy software
PHP software